Vagabond is a studio album by Lasse Stefanz released on 26 June 2007. The album was awarded a Guldklaven Award in the "Album of the Year" category during the Swedish Dansband Week in Malung.

Track listing
På egna vägar
Ingenting kan vara bättre
I varje andetag
Ingenting är glömt
Little Honda
Innan livet försvinner (duet with Anne Nördsti)
Jag kan se i dina ögon
It's Only Make Believe
Big Love
Tårar från himlen
Någon att älska
Vänd dig inte bort
Vill du bli min
Ta den tid du behöver

Chart positions

Certifications

References 

2007 albums
Lasse Stefanz albums